A Perfect Gentleman is a 1928 silent American comedy film, directed by Clyde Bruckman, which stars Monty Banks, Ernest Wood, Henry Barrows, and Ruth Dwyer.

Cast list
 Monty Banks as Monty Brooks
 Ernest Wood as George Cooper
 Henry Barrows as John Wayne
 Ruth Dwyer as His daughter
 Arthur Thalasso as Ship's officer
 Hazel Howell as His wife
 Agostino Borgato as Barco
 Mary Foy as The Aunt
 Syd Crossley as The Valet
 Jackie Coombs as The Baby

References

External links
 
 
 

1928 films
American silent feature films
Silent American comedy films
Films directed by Clyde Bruckman
Pathé Exchange films
American black-and-white films
1928 comedy films
1920s English-language films
1920s American films